The 2011 New Zealand snowstorms were a series of record breaking snow falls that affected both the North Island and South Island. The storms occurred over the span of a few weeks, beginning on 25 July 2011 in the North Island and subsequently spreading to the South. The storms subsided in late July and returned in August. It was the worst winter storm to hit New Zealand in seventy years. The heavy snowfalls caused widespread closures in many cities, including Christchurch, Wellington and Dunedin.

The South Island was the hardest hit, although the North Island was significantly affected, with the climatically mild cities of Auckland and Wellington reporting the first notable snowfall in over twenty years. The storms caused chaos around the country, leaving people stranded at airports, blocking state highways and resulting in entire regions, particularly Canterbury and Otago, being completely closed. The initial storm of July was relatively short lived, only to return again in August. The winter storm also caused mixed precipitation.

The snowfall was caused by Antarctic storms which moved northward. A large high pressure system had developed and stretched from Antarctica to the subtropics, where it had then merged with three neighbouring low pressure systems, causing cold temperatures and heavy snowfall.

25 July 2011

On 25 July 2011, New Zealand was gripped by its coldest winter snap in fifteen years. Christchurch Airport recorded its second-coldest day on 25 July. The severe winter storm was well predicted, with forecasters warning of the potential of heavy snow down to sea level in south and east of the South Island and to low levels in the North Island. This snowstorm was especially threatening as it was the school holidays, and many people were travelling.

The snowfalls also flattened sand dunes in Brighton and completely coated nearby Sumner Beach 1,700 homes within the Christchurch metropolitan area were without power. The city's bus service was also shut down for almost two days. Various highways were closed, including parts of State Highway 1 between Invercargill and Dunedin and State Highway 94, the road from Te Anau into Milford Sound. The storms lasted for roughly three days, before subsiding and returning early in the following month.

14–15 August 2011

A few days prior to this date, forecasters were warning of a severe snowstorm heading for New Zealand, even going as far as calling it the "perfect snowstorm". Snow fell consistently down to sea level in Wellington for the first time since 1976, and snow even fell for a brief time in Auckland for the first time in 80 years.

Much of the South Island was heavily blanketed, with schools closed in Queenstown, Dunedin, and Christchurch. The heavy snow also disrupted flights in and out of these centres, and also in and out of Wellington. Schools were also closed there due to the snow. Power was also lost to around 4,000 homes in South Taranaki, Manawatu, Whanganui, and Wairarapa. The storms caused airport closures in Christchurch, Queenstown and Dunedin. The Christchurch and Dunedin Donor Centres were closed and Westport and Mosgiel mobile collections were cancelled as a result of bad weather. The Canterbury Earthquake Recovery Authority (CERA) closed access to the Christchurch's earthquake-damaged red zone due to potential safety hazards. The snow caused power outages in rural areas of Canterbury, namely Rakaia, Westmelton, Leeston and Greendale due to fallen tree branches.

On 15 August, national electricity demand peaked at 6,902 megawatts, breaking the previous record of 6,635 MW set on 24 June 2007. The record would stand for nearly ten years before being broken by a peak demand of 6,924 MW on 29 June 2021.

Although Wellington received its largest snowfall in 30 years, the South Island received the most during the storms, with some regions receiving snowfall of up to 20–30 cm. The storm was reportedly the worst since 1939, when snow fell on the top of Maungawhau / Mount Eden and outer suburbs of Auckland, a city which does not generally receive any snowfall.

Impact

Power outages
Many homes around the country were without power, due to trees falling on power lines.

Road closures
Widespread road closures occurred across the Otago region on the South Island.

Ski resorts
Many ski resorts were completely closed due to being covered in dangerous amounts of snow and damage to infrastructure.

See also
 Climate of New Zealand
 Meteorological Service of New Zealand Limited

References

Weather events in New Zealand
Snowstorms
2011 meteorology
July 2011 events in New Zealand
August 2011 events in New Zealand